Gigi Chao (Chinese: 趙式芝; born 1979) is a Hong Kong activist and the vice-chair of Cheuk Nang (Holdings) Ltd.

Chao holds a Bachelor of Arts in Architecture with Honors from the University of Manchester's Manchester School of Architecture.

Chao, a lesbian, is an outspoken advocate for LGBT rights in Hong Kong and Asia.

In 2012, Chao gained international attention when her father, Cecil Chao, offered $65 million to any man who could marry her. Despite criticism, her father remained unrepentant. In 2014 Cecil Chao increased the reward to $180 million. Gigi responded publicly in an open letter printed in the South China Morning Post.  The letter expresses defiance of her father's wishes and asks for respect for the LGBT community.  

In 2019, Chao founded the organization Hong Kong Marriage Equality to advocate for the legalisation of same-sex marriage in Hong Kong. 
Chao wrote an early thesis on Marriage Equality and published it for peer review in 2011-2012.

References

External links 

 Biglove Alliance Founders
 Faith in Love Foundation, Gigi Chao
 Hong Kong Marriage Equality Members

1979 births
Living people
Hong Kong lesbians
Hong Kong LGBT rights activists